The Administrative Panel is one of five vocational panels which together elect 43 of the 60 members of Seanad Éireann, the upper house of the Oireachtas (the legislature of Ireland). The Administrative Panel elects seven senators.

Election
Article 18 of the Constitution of Ireland provides that 43 of the 60 senators are to be elected from five vocational panels. The Administrative Panel is defined in Article 18.7.1º(v) as "Public Administration and social services, including voluntary social activities". The Seanad returning officer maintains a list of nominating bodies for each of the five panels. Candidates may be nominated either by four members of the Oireachtas or by a nominating body. The electorate consists of city and county councillors and current members of the Oireachtas. As the Seanad election takes place after the election to the Dáil, the Oireachtas members are the members of the incoming Dáil and the outgoing Seanad. Seven senators are elected on the Administrative Panel, at least three of whom must have been nominated by Oireachtas members and at least three must have been nominated by nominating bodies.

Senators

Notes

List of nominating bodies
The following bodies are on the register of nominating bodies maintained by the Seanad Returning Officer for the Administrative Panel.
Association of Irish Local Government
Local Authority Members’ Association
Central Remedial Clinic
Enable Ireland Disability Services Limited
The Multiple Sclerosis Society of Ireland
Irish Wheelchair Association
Inclusion Ireland — National Association for People with an Intellectual Disability
National Association for the Deaf
The Irish Kidney Association Company CLG
Irish Deaf Society — National Association of the Deaf
Deaf Village Ireland
Disability Federation of Ireland
Irish Foster Care Association
The Alzheimer Society of Ireland
Co-operative Housing Ireland Society Ltd.
Co-operative House
Center for Independent Living Limited
Carmichael House
National Council for the Blind
Threshold
Care Alliance Ireland
The Immigrant Council of Ireland

References

Seanad constituencies